Harold "Harry" Joseph Stiff (23 October 1881 – 17 April 1939) was an English tug of war competitor who debuted at the age of 38 in the 1920 Summer Olympics, and won the gold medal representing Great Britain, as part of the City of London Police. He later became a landowner of the Horse and Groom Public House, Cornish Hall End, close to Finchingfield, Essex.

References

External links
profile
Olympic profile

1881 births
1939 deaths
English Olympic medallists
Olympic tug of war competitors of Great Britain
Tug of war competitors at the 1920 Summer Olympics
Olympic gold medallists for Great Britain
Olympic medalists in tug of war
Medalists at the 1920 Summer Olympics
City of London Police officers